Kingsbury County is a county in the U.S. state of South Dakota. As of the 2020 census, the population was 5,187. Its county seat is De Smet. The county was created in 1873, and was organized in 1880. It was named for brothers George W. and T. A. Kingsbury, descendants of the colonial English Kingsbury family in Boston, Massachusetts. They were prominently involved in the affairs of Dakota Territory and served as elected members of several Territorial Legislatures.

Geography
The terrain of Kingsbury County consists of low rolling hills. The central and east portions of the county hold numerous lakes and ponds. The land is largely devoted to agriculture. The terrain generally slopes to the southwest, and the highest point is near the midpoint of the east boundary line, at 1,857' (566m) ASL.

Lakes

 Cherry Lake
 Mud Lake
 Lake Albert
 Lake Badger
 Lake Henry
 Lake Iroquois
 Lake Preston
 Lake Thisted
 Lake Thompson
 Lake Whitewood
 Osceola Lake
 Plum Lake
 Spring Lake
 Spirit Lake
 Twin Lakes (partial)

Major highways
 U.S. Highway 14
 U.S. Highway 81
 South Dakota Highway 25

Adjacent counties

 Hamlin County – northeast
 Brookings County – east
 Lake County – southeast
 Miner County – south
 Sanborn County – southwest
 Beadle County – west
 Clark County – northwest

Protected areas
 Arnold State Public Shooting Area

Demographics
Industrialization of agriculture and the attraction of urban areas have contributed to the decline in population of Kingsbury County, similar to what has occurred in other Plains rural areas. In 2010 it had  less than half the population of its peak in 1930, before the Dust Bowl and the Great Depression.

2000 census
As of the 2000 United States Census, there were 5,815 people, 2,406 households, and 1,592 families in the county. The population density was 7 people per square mile (3/km2). There were 2,724 housing units at an average density of 3 per square mile (1/km2). The racial makeup of the county was 98.54% White, 0.05% Black or African American, 0.40% Native American, 0.29% Asian, 0.19% from other races, and 0.53% from two or more races. 0.69% of the population were Hispanic or Latino of any race. 36.2% were of German, 22.5% Norwegian, 8.4% Danish, 7.0% American and 5.9% Irish ancestry.

There were 2,406 households, out of which 27.90% had children under the age of 18 living with them, 59.00% were married couples living together, 4.40% had a female householder with no husband present, and 33.80% were non-families. 31.50% of all households were made up of individuals, and 17.80% had someone living alone who was 65 years of age or older. The average household size was 2.34 and the average family size was 2.95.

The county population contained 24.50% under the age of 18, 6.10% from 18 to 24, 22.90% from 25 to 44, 22.40% from 45 to 64, and 24.20% who were 65 years of age or older. The median age was 43 years. For every 100 females there were 96.30 males.  For every 100 females age 18 and over, there were 95.90 males.

The median income for a household in the county was $31,262, and the median income for a family was $41,057. Males had a median income of $26,681 versus $19,174 for females. The per capita income for the county was $16,522. About 7.00% of families and 10.00% of the population were below the poverty line, including 13.50% of those under age 18 and 11.10% of those age 65 or over.

2010 census
As of the 2010 United States Census, there were 5,148 people, 2,222 households, and 1,418 families in the county. The racial makeup of the county was 98.1% white, 0.5% American Indian, 0.3% Asian, 0.1% black or African American, 0.3% from other races, and 0.8% from two or more races. Those of Hispanic or Latino origin made up 1.4% of the population. In terms of European ancestry, 42.8% were German, 25.5% were Norwegian, 10.9% were Danish, 9.6% were Irish, 7.2% were English, and 3.5% were American.

Of the 2,222 households, 24.3% had children under the age of 18 living with them, 55.6% were married couples living together, 5.0% had a female householder with no husband present, 36.2% were non-families, and 32.2% of all households were made up of individuals. The average household size was 2.23 and the average family size was 2.81. The median age was 47.1 years.

The median income for a household in the county was $44,948 and the median income for a family was $56,925. Males had a median income of $35,585 versus $28,141 for females. The per capita income for the county was $24,660. About 7.0% of families and 9.2% of the population were below the poverty line, including 8.8% of those under age 18 and 10.8% of those age 65 or over.

Communities

Cities

 De Smet (county seat)
 Arlington (partial)
 Iroquois (partial)
 Lake Preston
 Oldham

Towns

 Badger
 Bancroft
 Erwin
 Hetland

Census-designated place
 Spring Lake Colony

Unincorporated communities
 Esmond
 Osceola

Ghost town
 Manchester

Townships

 Badger
 Baker
 De Smet
 Denver
 Esmond
 Hartland
 Iroquois
 Le Sueur
 Manchester
 Mathews
 Spirit Lake
 Spring Lake
 Whitewood

Notable people
 Harvey Dunn - painter and professor of Fine Arts
 Eugene Peter Knudsen - Minnesota state legislator and farmer
 Theodore Schultz -  Nobel prize winning economist
 Laura Ingalls Wilder - author

Politics
Kingsbury County voters have been reliably Republican for decades. In only two national elections since 1932 has the county selected the Democratic Party candidate (as of 2020).

See also
 National Register of Historic Places listings in Kingsbury County, South Dakota

References

External links
Official website

Further reading
 Johnson, Lyle R. "Decades of Drought: A Year by Year-by-Year Account of Weather-Related Changes in 1930s Kingsbury County," South Dakota History 43 (Fall 2013), 218–44.

 
1880 establishments in Dakota Territory
Populated places established in 1880